The surname Suster may refer to:

Mark Suster, American entrepreneur
Gerald Suster (1951–2001), British historian, occult writer, and novelist
Ron Suster, American politician and lawyer
Bernd Schuster (born 1959), German football manager
Suster, a song by Kwesta

See also
Roman Šuster (born 1978), Czech rugby union player